The RCA Dome (originally Hoosier Dome) was a domed stadium in Indianapolis. It was the home of the Indianapolis Colts NFL franchise for 24 seasons (1984–2007).

It was completed at a cost of $77.5 million, as part of the Indiana Convention Center, with the costs split between private and public money. The largest crowd to attend an event at the Dome was 62,167 for WrestleMania VIII in 1992. It was demolished on December 20, 2008, as part of a project to expand the attached convention center.

Description

Like other domes of this style (the Hubert H. Humphrey Metrodome, BC Place, the Carrier Dome, and the Pontiac Silverdome) there were warning signs posted cautioning patrons of the high winds at the doors when exiting the facility.

History

The domed stadium was similar in design and appearance to the Metrodome and the previous BC Place roof, owing in great part to the involvement of engineers David Geiger and Walter Bird, pioneers in air-supported roofs.

The stadium was originally named the Hoosier Dome until 1994 when RCA paid $10 million for the naming rights for 10 years, with two 5-year options to RCA at a cost of $3.5 million if invoked. The stadium seated 56,127 for football, the smallest in the NFL. Modifications were made to the stadium in 1999 to expand the suites and add club seating. Before that, the maximum seating for a football crowd was 60,272. The stadium was built to lure a National Football League team to Indianapolis, and while still under construction, the Baltimore Colts took the bait on March 29, 1984.

The Dome was officially dedicated on August 11, 1984, as a sellout crowd watched the Indianapolis Colts defeat the New York Giants in an NFL preseason game. The Buffalo Bills and Chicago Bears played a preseason game at the Hoosier Dome on August 26, 1984, which had been scheduled prior to the Colts moving in.

The football playing surface was originally AstroTurf, and replaced with FieldTurf in 2005.

The Colts moved into the new, retractable-roof, Lucas Oil Stadium for the 2008 NFL season. The RCA Dome was replaced by additional space for the adjacent Indiana Convention Center. The new convention space connects to Lucas Oil Stadium in much the same way that the existing Indiana Convention Center had been connected to the RCA Dome (although the new connecting walkway now passes under a railroad track).

Demolition
On September 24, 2008, the roof of the Dome was deflated, which took about 45 minutes. The building itself was imploded on December 20, 2008, and was featured on the second series premiere of the National Geographic show Blowdown.

An Indianapolis nonprofit, People for Urban Progress, rescued  of the Dome roof. They work with local Indianapolis designers to recycle the material into community shade structures and art installations, as well as wallets, purses and bags.

Events

Football
Although the Dome never hosted any Super Bowls, it played host to the 2006 AFC Championship Game, which saw the Colts erase a 21–3 deficit for a come-from-behind 38–34 win over the New England Patriots in what would ultimately be the only AFC Championship Game hosted at the Dome. 

The Dome also hosted three AFC Divisional Round games in 1999, 2005, and 2007, with the Colts posting an 0–3 record in those games; the 2005 game, which saw the heavily-favored Colts lose to the Pittsburgh Steelers 21-18 in one of the biggest upsets in NFL history (en-route to the Steelers victory in Super Bowl XL), is best remembered for Colts cornerback Nick Harper recovering a Jerome Bettis fumble only for Mike Vanderjagt to miss the game-tying field goal at the end of the game. The Dome also hosted three AFC wild card games in 2003, 2004, and 2006, with the Colts going 3–0 in those games. The Colts' 28–24 loss to the San Diego Chargers in the 2007 Divisional Round proved to be the stadium's final game before the Colts moved on to Lucas Oil Stadium the following season.

Basketball
In addition to football, the Dome hosted several basketball games. The first was an exhibition game in 1984 between an NBA All-Star team led by home-state hero Larry Bird and the United States Olympic Men's Basketball team, coached by Bob Knight, who was at the time the coach of Indiana University. The Dome hosted the 1985 NBA All-Star Game in February, where an NBA-record crowd of 43,146 saw the Western Conference beat the host Eastern Conference 140–129. Since then it hosted many NCAA Men's Division I Basketball Championship games, including four Final Fours (1991, 1997, 2000, 2006). The NCAA, whose headquarters are in Indianapolis, has committed to holding the Final Four in Indianapolis once every five years. The RCA Dome hosted its only Women's Final Four in 2005. It served as one of two sites for the FIBA Men's Basketball World Championship in 2002, sharing the honors with Gainbridge Fieldhouse, the home of the Indiana Pacers.

Other sports
During the 1987 Pan American Games, the RCA Dome hosted the Gymnastics and Handball competitions as well as the closing ceremonies.

In 1991, the Dome hosted the 1991 World Artistic Gymnastics Championships. In 1992, the Dome hosted WrestleMania VIII for the World Wrestling Federation.

Monster Jam hosted events at the venue every year as part of its first quarter season. The last event was held in 2008 a few months before the venue was demolished.

In addition, it hosted the NCAA Men's Division I Indoor Track and Field Championships from 1989 to 1999, the 1990 General Conference Session of Seventh-day Adventists, the Indiana High School Athletic Association's annual boys and girls championships (with the boys' final game witnessed by the largest crowd [over 40,000] ever for a high school basketball game). Additionally, the RCA Dome served as the site of the Indiana State School Music Association State Marching Band Competition, the Bands of America Grand Nationals, and the Drum Corps International Midwestern Regional, along with the NFL Scouting Combine in February of each year. The 2004 U.S. Olympic Team Wrestling Trials were held in the Dome. It also hosted a PBR Built Ford Tough Series bull riding event in 2004.

The Thunder in the Dome was a midget car race held from 1985 to 2001. The Dome also hosted an AMA Supercross Championship round from 1992 to 2008.

Concerts
Many concerts took place in this venue, such as Farm Aid IV in 1990 (Elton John, Guns N' Roses, Lou Reed, John Mellencamp, Genesis, CSN&Y, Willie Nelson, Iggy Pop, Don Henley & Bonnie Raitt to name a few), The Monsters of Rock Festival (Van Halen, Metallica, Scorpions, Dokken, and Kingdom Come), the 1987 Pink Floyd reunion and the Rolling Stones. It also hosted events such as Indiana State University college football, Black Expo, Promise Keepers, truck pulls, wrestling and many high school events.

References

RCA
American football venues in Indiana
Basketball venues in Indiana
Sports venues demolished in 2008
Covered stadiums in the United States
Defunct National Football League venues
Event venues established in 1983
Sports venues completed in 1984
1983 establishments in Indiana
2008 disestablishments in Indiana
Indianapolis Colts stadiums
Sports venues in Indianapolis
Demolished sports venues in Indiana
Indoor track and field venues in Indiana
Air-supported structures
Gymnastics venues in Indiana
Wrestling venues in Indiana
Buildings and structures demolished by controlled implosion
Pan American Games handball venues
Handball venues in the United States
NCAA Division I men's basketball tournament Final Four venues